Urszulewka is a river of Poland, a tributary of the Skrwa Prawa. It is the outflow of the Lake Urszulewskie, and joins the Skrwa Prawa near Dziki Bór.

Rivers of Poland
Rivers of Masovian Voivodeship